Pratham is an Indian ionospheric research satellite which will be operated by the Indian Institute of Technology Bombay as part of the Student Satellite Initiative. Its primary mission is to count electrons in the Earth's ionosphere.

It was conceptualized by a team of students under the supervision of Professor K. Sudhakar. Pratham was successfully launched on 26 September 2016 from Satish Dhawan Space Centre, Sriharikota, Andhra Pradesh along with 7 other satellites on PSLV C-35.

Mission 
'Pratham' has a Four-fold Mission Statement:

See also

 Jugnu (satellite)

External links
 Pratham - IIT Bombay Student Satellite Initiative

References

Indian Institutes of Technology
Student satellites
Satellites of India
Spacecraft launched by India in 2016